United Nations Security Council resolution 690, adopted unanimously on 29 April 1991, after recalling resolutions 621 (1988) and 658 (1990) and noting a report by the Secretary-General on the situation in Western Sahara, the Council approved the report and decided to establish the United Nations Mission for the Referendum in Western Sahara (MINURSO) in accordance with the Secretary-General's recommendations. The Mission was to implement the Settlement Plan for a referendum of self-determination for the people of Western Sahara.

The Council called upon Morocco and the Polisario Front to co-operate with the Secretary-General and the Mission, expressing its full support to him and the Organisation of African Unity for their efforts. It also decided that the transitional period will begin no later than sixteen weeks after the General Assembly approves the budget of MINURSO. In May 1991, the General Assembly approved the budget.

A ceasefire came into effect on 6 September 1991, and MINURSO was deployed thereafter.

See also
 History of Western Sahara
 List of United Nations Security Council Resolutions 601 to 700 (1987–1991)
 Sahrawi Arab Democratic Republic

References

External links
 
Text of the Resolution at undocs.org

 0690
 0690
April 1991 events
1991 in Western Sahara